The 1999 NHK Trophy was the final event of six in the 1999–2000 ISU Grand Prix of Figure Skating, a senior-level international invitational competition series. It was held at the Rainbow Ice Arena in Nagoya on December 2–5. Medals were awarded in the disciplines of men's singles, ladies' singles, pair skating, and ice dancing. Skaters earned points toward qualifying for the 1999–2000 Grand Prix Final.

Results

Men

Ladies

Pairs

Ice dancing

References

External links
 1999 NHK Trophy

Nhk Trophy, 1999
NHK Trophy